Iwan Blijd (born 8 May 1953) is a Surinamese judoka, who represented his country at the 1972 Summer Olympics.

Blijd was just one of two athletes selected to represent Suriname at the 1972 Summer Olympics and was the first Surinamese judoka at the Olympics, he was 19 years old when he competed in the 63 kg event, he was drawn against Marcel Burkhard from Switzerland in the first round and lost the bout just after 5 minutes and therefore didn't advance any further in the competition.

References

1953 births
Living people
Surinamese male judoka
Judoka at the 1972 Summer Olympics
Olympic judoka of Suriname